Francisco de Sá Noronha (Viana do Castelo, 1820 – 1881) was a Portuguese composer and violinist who wrote a "Fantasy for violin and orchestra", and many other works.

References 
Classical Composers 

1820 births
1881 deaths
Portuguese composers
Portuguese male composers
People from Viana do Castelo
19th-century Portuguese people
19th-century composers
19th-century male musicians